Munira A. Al-Fadhel (born 1958) is a Bahraini poet, editor, writer and academic.

Early life and education 
Al-Fadhel was born in 1958, and studied at the University of Essex, completing a doctorate in comparative literature.

She was a Fulbright Scholar during the 1997-1998 academic year.

Career 
She has worked as an assistant professor at the University of Bahrain's department of English since 1994. 

In 2013, Al-Fadhel was one of five Bahraini women writers invited to attend a dinner reception with the wife of the Palestinian Ambassador to Bahrain.

She has published numerous short works of literary criticism and analysis and has served on the judging panel of the 2011 Arabic Booker Prize.

Books (as an author) 
She has also written three books:

 Al-Remora, short stories
 For the Voice, For the Fragile Echo, novella (The Brooklyn Rail, 2011)
 Woman, Place and Memory, critical essays on Arab women's writing

Book chapters 
 From localism to cosmopolitanism: a Bahreini perspective, chapter in Cosmopolitanism, Identity and Authenticity in the Middle East (Routledge, 1999) ISBN 9781315027364

Books (as a co-editor) 

 Pearl, Dreams of Shell (Howling Dog Press, 2007, ISBN 978-1882863792), an anthology of modern Bahraini poetry in English translation.

Poetry 

 Namaskar

Personal life 
Al-Fadhel lives in Bahrain and Boston.

References

External links 

 English translation of For the Voice, For the Fragile Echo

Living people
Bahraini women writers
Bahraini short story writers
Bahraini literary critics
Women short story writers
Women critics
21st-century women writers
21st-century short story writers
Alumni of the University of Essex
Academic staff of the University of Bahrain
Bahraini emigrants to the United States
1958 births